The Island Image is a Chesapeake Bay log canoe, built in 1885 at Elliot's Island, Maryland, by Herman Jones and Isaac Moore.  It is 29'-8½" long with a beam of 5-10¼", and has a straight, raking stem and a sharp stern. It is privately owned, and races under No. 17. It is one of the last 22 surviving traditional Chesapeake Bay racing log canoes that carry on a tradition of racing on the Eastern Shore of Maryland that has existed since the 1840s. She is located at Chestertown, Kent County, Maryland.

The Island Image was listed on the National Register of Historic Places in 1985.

References

External links
, including photo in 1984, at Maryland Historical Trust

Kent County, Maryland
Ships on the National Register of Historic Places in Maryland
National Register of Historic Places in Kent County, Maryland